The 136th Pennsylvania House of Representatives District is located in Southeastern Pennsylvania and has been represented since 1999 by Robert L. Freeman.

District profile
The 136th Pennsylvania House of Representatives District is located in  Northampton County. It includes Lafayette College. It is made up of the following areas:

 Easton
 Freemansburg
 Glendon
 Hellertown
 Lower Saucon Township (PART, Districts 03, 05 and 06)
 Palmer Township (PART)
 District Eastern
 District Western [PART, Division 01]
 West Easton
 Williams Township
 Wilson

Representatives

Recent election results

References

External links
District map from the United States Census Bureau
Pennsylvania House Legislative District Maps from the Pennsylvania Redistricting Commission.  
Population Data for District 136 from the Pennsylvania Redistricting Commission.

Government of Northampton County, Pennsylvania
136